Christopher Sullivan or Chris Sullivan may refer to:

Entertainment
Chris Sullivan (actor) (born 1980), American actor and musician who appears in The Knick and This Is Us
Chris "Shockwave" Sullivan, American actor and beatboxer on The Electric Company

Sportspeople
Chris Sullivan (American football) (born 1973), American football player
Christopher Sullivan (soccer, born 1965) (born 1965), American soccer player
Chris Sullivan (soccer, born 1988) (born 1988), Australian footballer for Odysseas Kordelio
Chris Sullivan (Australian rules footballer) (born 1972), former Australian rules footballer

Others
Christopher D. Sullivan (1870–1942), U.S. Representative from New York, 1917–1941
Chris T. Sullivan (born 1948), founder and CEO of Outback Steakhouse